The Billings Chamber of Commerce Building, at 303 N. 27th St. in Billings, Montana, was built in 1911.  It was listed on the National Register of Historic Places in 1972.

It is a three-story brick building upon a sandstone foundation.  It was designed by architect G. McAlister in Italian Renaissance Revival style and was built by contractors Gagnon and Company.

It was built as an Elks Club building but the club lost ownership due to debts in 1918.

References

Italian Renaissance Revival architecture
National Register of Historic Places in Yellowstone County, Montana

Buildings and structures completed in 1911
Elks buildings